Chernogorovo (Bulgarian : Черногорово) is a village in the municipality of Dimitrovgrad, in Haskovo Province, in southern Bulgaria.

Etymology

The name 'Chernogorovo' is derived from a compact word composed of 'cherno'(черно) meaning black and 'gora'(гора) meaning forest, followed by the suffix -ovo (ово), which is a common naming suffix for places in Bulgarian.

References

Villages in Haskovo Province